Kamar Mushani , is a town with four union councils, an administrative subdivision, of Mianwali District in the Punjab province of Pakistan. It is part of Isakhel Tehsil.

References

Mianwali District
Union councils of Mianwali District